This is a list of airlines currently operating in Kiribati.

See also
 List of airlines
 List of defunct airlines of Republic of Kiribati

Airlines of Kiribati
Kiribati
Kiribati

Airlines